Sohaila Kapur is an Indian actress, journalist, television personality, theatre director and playwright.

Early life
Sohaila was born in a Punjabi Hindu family to Kulbhushan Kapur and Sheel Kanta Kapur. Her father was the physician to Fakhruddin Ali Ahmed, former President of India.

The niece of famous Indian actor Dev Anand. Her mother, Sheel Kanta Kapur was the sister of Chetan, Dev and Vijay Anand. She is the third and the youngest sister of Indian filmmaker Shekhar Kapur.

She is graduated from Delhi University.

Career
After working with Times of India for like ten years as a journalist. She then devoted herself to free lance writing. She has written over hundred articles for magazines and newspapers. In 1983, she also authored a book on Indian esoteric rites, called Witchcraft in Western India.

She has also anchored shows for channels like Doordarshan and Omni Television. She is also engaged as an anchor-journalist for Lok Sabha TV.

As a playwright, she had written several plays. In 2002, she directed her first play a musical called Yeh Hai Mumbai Meri Jaan. It was premiered at the Traverse Theatre at Edinburgh.

She also directed the play titled Rumi: Unveil the Sun, which got critical and popular acclaim. The play was nominated as one of the best plays produced in the country and best play director at the Mahindra Excellence in Theatre Awards in 2008 at New Delhi.

Personal life
Sohaila first married Anirudh Limaye, but the marriage ended in divorce. Then she married Ontario based Chartered Accountant Anil Charnalia. 

On 23 October 1999, her husband Anil Charnalia died during an airplane flight from a massive Heart Attack. A big lawsuit was filed against the airlines due to negligence.

Bibliography

Acting credits

Films

Television

References

External links
 

Indian actresses
Living people
Year of birth missing (living people)
Hindi-language writers
Hindi dramatists and playwrights
Indian dramatists and playwrights
20th-century Indian dramatists and playwrights
Actresses from Mumbai
Actresses in Hindi cinema
Indian television journalists
Indian television presenters
Indian journalists